Douglas County is a county located in the U.S. state of Illinois. As of the 2020 United States Census, the population was 19,740. The county seat is Tuscola.

History
Douglas County was formed in 1859 out of Coles County. It was named for Stephen A. Douglas, who was elected to the United States Senate in 1858, following the Lincoln-Douglas Debates.

Geography

Climate and weather

Adjacent counties

 Champaign County - north
 Vermilion County - northeast
 Edgar County - east
 Coles County - south
 Moultrie County - west
 Piatt County - northwest

Major highways

  Interstate 57
  US Route 36
  US Route 45
  Illinois Route 49
  Illinois Route 130
  Illinois Route 133

Demographics

As of the 2010 United States Census, there were 19,980 people, 7,720 households, and 5,377 families living in the county. The racial makeup of the county was 95.7% white, 0.4% Asian, 0.3% black or African American, 0.2% American Indian, 2.3% from other races, and 1.2% from two or more races. Those of Hispanic or Latino origin made up 6.1% of the population. In terms of ancestry, 29.6% were German, 12.6% were American, 12.1% were English, and 10.7% were Irish.

Of the 7,720 households, 32.6% had children under the age of 18 living with them, 57.0% were married couples living together, 8.5% had a female householder with no husband present, 30.3% were non-families, and 26.1% of all households were made up of individuals. The average household size was 2.57 and the average family size was 3.11. The median age was 38.7 years.

The median income for a household in the county was $46,941 and the median income for a family was $60,352. Males had a median income of $41,318 versus $28,731 for females. The per capita income for the county was $21,438. About 7.1% of families and 10.2% of the population were below the poverty line, including 14.0% of those under age 18 and 7.2% of those age 65 or over.

Communities

Cities

 Arcola
 Newman
 Tuscola (seat)
 Villa Grove

Villages

 Arthur (partial)
 Atwood (partial)
 Camargo
 Garrett
 Hindsboro

Unincorporated communities

 Bourbon
 Chesterville
 Chicken Bristle
 Fairland
 Ficklin
 Filson
 Galton
 Hugo
 Hayes
 Hillcrest
 Kemp
 Murdock
 North Prairie Acres
 Patterson Springs
 West Ridge

Townships

 Arcola
 Bourbon
 Bowdre
 Camargo
 Garrett
 Murdock
 Newman
 Sargent
 Tuscola

Politics
Douglas is a strongly Republican county. Apart from a narrow plurality of thirty-two votes to Bill Clinton in 1992, it has voted Republican in every Presidential election since 1968, and in all but five overall since 1880. Despite its long-time Republican leanings, Hillary Clinton’s 2016 performance of gaining a mere 23.8 percent of the county’s vote stands over six percent worse than any Democrat since the Civil War.

See also
 National Register of Historic Places listings in Douglas County, Illinois

References

 US Census Bureau 2007 TIGER/Line Shapefiles
 US Board on Geographic Names (GNIS)
 US National Atlas

External links

 Douglas County Fact Sheet

 
Illinois counties
1859 establishments in Illinois
Populated places established in 1859